Christopher Arthur Hurst (born October 12, 1954) is an American politician of the Democratic Party who served as a member of the Washington House of Representatives, representing the 31st Legislative District from 1999 to 2003 and again from 2007 to 2017.

References

External links
Washington State Legislature - Rep. Christopher Hurst official WA House website
Follow the Money - Christopher Hurst
2006 2000 1998 1996 campaign contributions

1954 births
Living people
Politicians from Seattle
American Presbyterians
Democratic Party members of the Washington House of Representatives
21st-century American politicians